Olympic Stadium (known locally as Olimpiyskiy) was an indoor arena, located in Moscow, Russia. It was built for the 1980 Summer Olympics and, divided into two separated halls, hosted the basketball and boxing events. It closed in March 2019 and was demolished, for the construction of a new complex, in 2020.

Events

Sports

A part of the "Olimpiyskiy Sports Complex", it made up one architectural ensemble with another venue, constructed at the same time, the Swimming Pool. Its capacity was 80,000 people, and the stadium could hold up to 16,000 people for televised events.

In May 2014, the Government of Moscow auctioned 65% of shares in the stadium that it previously controlled. Oil company ZAO Neftegazprod won the auction, paying ₽4,672 billion rubles (approximately €100 million euros). Sporting events held at the stadium included the Davis Cup finals and the Kremlin Cup tennis tournament.

It was the world's first indoor bandy arena, and hosted the Bandy World Championships in 1989 (the first bandy world championship held indoors) and 2008.

The arena hosted the 1999 FIBA EuroStars game and the 2005 Euroleague Final Four. The 2013 European Artistic Gymnastics Championships were held in the stadium between 17 and 23 April 2013.

The venue hosted the World Boxing Super Series men's, cruiserweight final between Oleksandr Usyk and Murat Gassiev in front of 24,000 fans in attendance on 21 July 2018. Usyk won the fight comfortably, becoming the first fighter at cruiserweight to unify all four world title belts. Muhammad Ali's widow, Lonnie Ali, presented the Ali trophy to Usyk after the fight.

Music events

At the time of its demolition, SC Olympiyskiy was the largest indoor concert arena in Russia. Many international artists played concerts here as part of their world tours, such as A-ha, Asia, Shakira, 30 Seconds to Mars, Beyoncé, Britney Spears, Black Sabbath, Slipknot, Depeche Mode, Enrique Iglesias, George Michael, Imagine Dragons, Iron Maiden, Jamiroquai, Justin Bieber, Justin Timberlake, Kylie Minogue, Lady Gaga, Linkin Park, Madonna, Muse, Nazareth, Paul McCartney, Pink Floyd, Roger Waters, Rihanna, Robbie Williams, Roxette, Whitney Houston. The venue hosted the Eurovision Song Contest 2009, the first time Russia hosted the competition.

See also
 List of indoor arenas in Russia
 List of tennis stadiums by capacity

References

External links

  
 Information on venue

Sports venues in Moscow
Indoor arenas built in the Soviet Union
Indoor arenas in Russia
Tennis venues in Russia
Music venues in Russia
Venues of the 1980 Summer Olympics
Bandy venues in Russia
Olympic basketball venues
Olympic boxing venues
Indoor track and field venues
Boxing venues in Russia
Basketball venues in Russia
Bandy World Championships stadiums
Covered stadiums
1994 Davis Cup
1995 Davis Cup
1980 establishments in the Soviet Union
Sports venues completed in 1980
Sports venues demolished in 2020
Defunct sports venues in Russia
Demolished buildings and structures in Moscow
Demolished sports venues